Rizvan Rashitovich Utsiyev (born 7 February 1988) is a Russian football player of Chechen origin who plays for Akhmat.

Career
Utsiyev made his professional debut in 2005, coming as a substitute for Terek in the Russian Premier League game against Lokomotiv.

In the second part of 2007 season he was loaned to Russian Second Division's Kavkaztransgaz-2005 alongside his Terek teammate Adlan Katsayev.

Career statistics

Club

References

External links
 
 

1988 births
People from Argun, Chechen Republic
Living people
Russian footballers
Russia youth international footballers
Association football defenders
Association football midfielders
FC Akhmat Grozny players
Russian Premier League players
Russian people of Chechen descent
Chechen people
Sportspeople from Chechnya